Dora Corty-Mönkemeyer (27 April 1890 – 17 February 1970) was a German painter. Her work was part of the painting event in the art competition at the 1936 Summer Olympics.

References

1890 births
1970 deaths
People from Dresden
People from the Kingdom of Saxony
German women painters
Olympic competitors in art competitions
20th-century German painters
20th-century German women